Lawrence Henry Johnson (1861 in Germany – 1947) was a Minnesota Republican politician and a Speaker of the Minnesota House of Representatives. Johnson, a bridge contractor and engineer, came to Minnesota in 1884, and was elected to the Minnesota House of Representatives in 1900. He served five terms, serving as speaker from 1907 to 1909. Johnson died in 1947.

References

1862 births
1947 deaths
Speakers of the Minnesota House of Representatives
Republican Party members of the Minnesota House of Representatives
German emigrants to the United States